Tři chlapi v chalupě is a 1963 Czechoslovak film directed by Josef Mach. The film starred Josef Kemr.

References

External links
 

1963 films
Czechoslovak comedy films
1960s Czech-language films
Czech comedy films
1960s Czech films